Connie Isabelle Kaldor,  (born 9 May 1953) is a Canadian folk singer-songwriter. She is the recipient of three Juno awards.

Early life and education
Kaldor was born in Regina, Saskatchewan. She graduated from Campbell Collegiate in Regina in 1972 and the University of Alberta in 1976 with a BFA degree in theatre.

Career
Kaldor performed with various theatre groups, including Theatre Passe Muraille, The Mummers and 25th Street House Theatre, until 1979, when she gave it up to start a full-time music career. In 1981, she founded her own independent record label, Coyote Entertainment, and has released fourteen albums. In 1997, she was featured performer in Moose Jaw, Saskatchewan on the last broadcast of Peter Gzowski's CBC national radio program Morningside.

Kaldor wrote the lyrics for Svetlana Zylin's musical, feminist interpretation of the bible, The Destruction of Eve. The musical premiered in 1998 in Toronto with Company of Sirens.

She has won the Juno Award for best children's album three times, in 1989, 2004, and 2005. Most of her music is for adults. She co-wrote a song for the animated television series based on the comic strip For Better or For Worse, which debuted in 2000.

She is married to music producer and Hart-Rouge member Paul Campagne, and lives in Montreal.

Her song "Wanderlust" was covered by Cosy Sheridan.

In 2003, her television show @ Wood River Hall debuted on VisionTV.

In 2006, she was made a Member of the Order of Canada.

Discography
 One Of These Days (1981)
 Moonlight Grocery (1984)
 New Songs for an Old Celebration (1986) (with Roy Forbes)
 Lullaby Berceuse (1988) (with Carmen Campagne)
 Gentle of Heart (1989)
 Wood River (1992)
 Out of the Blue (1994)
 Small Café (1996)
 Love is a Truck (2000)
 A Duck in New York City (2003)
 A Poodle in Paris (2004)
 Sky With Nothing to Get in the Way (2005)
 Vinyl Songbook (2005)
 Postcards from the Road (2009)
 Love Sask (2014)
 Everyday Moments (2019)
 Prairie Christmas (2020)

References

External links
 
 CanadianBands.com entry – Connie Kaldor
 The Canadian Encyclopedia: Connie Kaldor

1953 births
Living people
Canadian women singer-songwriters
Canadian folk singer-songwriters
Feminist musicians
Members of the Order of Canada
Musicians from Regina, Saskatchewan
Juno Award for Children's Album of the Year winners
20th-century Canadian women singers
21st-century Canadian women singers